Amelia Jane is a fictional character and book series by Enid Blyton. Her initial book, Naughty Amelia Jane!, appeared in 1939. According to Blyton's daughter Gillian, the main character was based on a large handmade doll given to her by her mother on her third birthday.

Books on Amelia Jane:
Naughty Amelia Jane, Amelia Jane is naughty again, Good Idea Amelia Jane, etc.

References

Citations

Bibliography

Enid Blyton series
Literary characters introduced in 1939